Mollaköy can refer to:

 Mollaköy, Erzincan
 Mollaköy, Kastamonu